Gavar State University (GSU) (Armenian: Գավառի Պետական Համալսարան) is a university in Gavar, Gegharkunik Province, Armenia. Founded on 5 May 1993, it is the largest university in the Gegharkunik Province with 4 faculties. The University provides degrees in Philology, Natural Sciences, Humanities and Economics. Currently, more than 2,400 students are attending the university.

Currently, the rector of the university is the founder Dr. professor Hrant Hakobyan.

Faculties
As of 2017, the university is home to 4 faculties:

Faculty of Philology
Section of Armenian Language and Literature
Section of Russian Language and Literature
Section of Foreign Languages
Faculty of Natural Sciences
Section of Geography
Section of Biology and Ecology
Section of Informatics and Physical Mathematics
Faculty of Humanities
Section of Law
Section of History
Section of Public Sciences
Faculty of Economics
Section of Management and Finance
Section of Accounting

References

Universities in Armenia
Educational institutions established in 1993
1993 establishments in Armenia